Marius Rouvier (31 July 1903 – 30 November 1981) was a French racing cyclist. He rode in the 1927 Tour de France.

References

1903 births
1981 deaths
French male cyclists
Place of birth missing